McGavock Family Cemetery is a historic family cemetery located near Fort Chiswell, Wythe County, Virginia. It is located on a hill above The Mansion at Fort Chiswell.  The cemetery includes approximately about 15 Germanic sandstone monuments dating from 1812 to the late-1830s.

It was listed on the National Register of Historic Places in 1980.

References

External links
 

Cemeteries on the National Register of Historic Places in Virginia
Buildings and structures in Wythe County, Virginia
National Register of Historic Places in Wythe County, Virginia
McGavock family